The McRae Jail is a former local jail on East First Street in McRae, Arkansas.  It is a small single-story masonry structure, built out of cast concrete.  It has a single door with a barred opening, and small openings on the sides, also barred.  Built about 1934 with funding from the Works Progress Administration (WPA), it is one of three jails built in White County by the WPA, and is of those three the best preserved.

The building was listed on the National Register of Historic Places in 1992.

See also
 Beebe Jail
 Russell Jail
 National Register of Historic Places listings in White County, Arkansas

References

Jails on the National Register of Historic Places in Arkansas
Government buildings completed in 1934
National Register of Historic Places in White County, Arkansas
1934 establishments in Arkansas
Works Progress Administration in Arkansas